Curtis Knight and the Squires were a New York band that was fronted by singer and guitarist Curtis Knight in the mid-1960s. Both Jimi Hendrix and sax player Lonnie Youngblood were members for a while.

Background
The band is referred to as a workaday party R&B band by Billboard.<ref>Billboard - ARTISTS / Curtis Knight & the Squires</ref>
The line up of the group wasn't always with the same musicians. Sax player Lonnie Youngblood had been a member. The line up pictured on the  cover of the You Can't Use My Name: The RSVP/PPX Sessions album features Curtis Knight, Jimi Hendrix, Marion Booker and Ace Hall.Daily Express - Remembering Jimi Hendrix 1942-1970, 11/13

At some stage in 1964, Hendrix met Knight in the lobby of a Harlem residential hotel and they hit it off. Hendrix became a member of the band Curtis Knight and the Squires in October the following year. While with the band, Hendrix signed a contract with the owner of PPX Studios, Ed Chaplin for just one dollar. This would later cause major problems for Hendrix.
He finally left The Squires on May 20, 1966.

Releases
In September 1966, "Hornet's Nest" bw "Knock Yourself Out" were released on the RSVP label, RSVP  1124. Hendrix co-composed them with Jerry Simon.Jimi Hendrix - From The Benjamin Franklin Studios Part 2, By Gary Geldeart, Steve Rodham - Page 54 A218. The two songs on the single are the representative of Hendrix's first compositions to be on a recorded release.

In 2000, the UK label Jungle records released  the album Jimi Hendrix With  Curtis Knight & The Squires  – Knock Yourself Out: The 1965 Studio Sessions which in addition to the 10 studio tracks included 5 bonus live tracks.

In 2015, the album You Can't Use My Name: The RSVP/PPX Sessions'' was released. It featured recordings Hendrix made with the group around 1965. The album features "Hornets Nest", "No Such Animal", and "Knock Yourself Out". It also features a song called  "How Would You Feel", which has a strong resemblance to Bob Dylan's "Like A Rolling Stone", which also happens to be a black rock protest song.

Personnel
 Napoleon Anderson aka Hank Anderson ... bass
 Marion Booker ...  drums (often spelled Marlon Booker) 
 George Bragg ...  drums
 Nathaniel Edmonds Sr. aka Nate Edmonds ... keyboards
 Ditto Edwards ...  drums 
 Ed "Bugs" Gregory ... bass 
 Ace Hall ... bass & tambourine 
 James Marshall Hendrix aka Jimmy James aka Jimi Hendrix ... guitar & vocals 
 Harry Jensen - guitar & bass 
 Curtis McNear aka Curtis Knight ... vocals, guitar & tambourine 
 Ray Lucas ...  drums 
 "Shears" ...  guitar (participated in the 1967 sessions)
 Lonnie Thomas aka Lonnie Youngblood ... sax & vocals

Discography

References

Musical groups established in the 1960s
Musical groups disestablished in 1966
Musical groups from New York City
Jimi Hendrix
1960s establishments in New York (state)
1966 disestablishments in New York (state)